Aerogaviota is an airline based in Havana, Cuba. It operates domestic flights within Cuba as well as flights from Cuba to Jamaica. Its main base is Playa Baracoa, Havana, although it occasionally flies out of and into José Martí International Airport, Havana.

History
The airline was established by the Cuban army and started operations in 1994. and is wholly owned by the Government of Cuba, run by Corporación de la Aviación Civil S.A of Cuba.

Accidents and incidents

On 29 April 2017, an Antonov An-26 chartered by Cuban military crashed at Las Lomas de San Cristóbal, killing all 8 people on board.

Destinations

Aerogaviota operated scheduled services to the following domestic destinations : Baracoa, Cayo Coco, Havana, Holguín, and Santiago de Cuba.

The airline also serves Kingston and Montego Bay, Jamaica. In the past, it also served the route Holguín-Nassau (The Bahamas).

Fleet

The Aerogaviota fleet includes the following aircraft :

 4 ATR 42-500
 1 Mil Mi-8P

References

External links

Aerogaviota 
Aerogaviota Fleet

Airlines of Cuba
Airlines established in 1994
Military airlines
Government-owned airlines
1994 establishments in Cuba